Aegir, also Saturn XXXVI (provisional designation S/2004 S 10), is a natural satellite of Saturn. Its discovery was announced by Scott S. Sheppard, David C. Jewitt, Jan Kleyna, and Brian G. Marsden on May 4, 2005, from observations taken between December 12, 2004, and March 11, 2005.

Aegir is about 6 kilometres in diameter, and orbits Saturn at an average distance of 19,618 Mm in 1025.908 days, at an inclination of 167° to the ecliptic (140° to Saturn's equator), in a retrograde direction and with an eccentricity of 0.237.

Name
The moon was named in April 2007 after Ægir, a giant from Norse mythology, the personification of tranquil seas, the one who soothes storms away. He is a son of Fornjót, and brother of Logi (fire, flame) and Kári (wind). The exoplanet Epsilon Eridani b (AEgir) was also named after this figure in 2015.

The name may be pronounced various ways. (with the 'g' pronounced as a y-sound) approximates modern Norwegian and Icelandic.

References

External links
 T. Denk's Aegir website
 Institute for Astronomy Saturn Satellite Data
 D. Jewitt's New Satellites of Saturn page
 IAUC 8523: New Satellites of Saturn May 4, 2005 (discovery)
 MPEC 2005-J13: Twelve New Satellites of  Saturn May 3, 2005 (discovery and ephemeris)
 IAUC 8826: Satellites of Jupiter and Saturn April 5, 2007 (naming the moon)

Norse group
Moons of Saturn
Irregular satellites
Discoveries by Scott S. Sheppard
Astronomical objects discovered in 2005
Moons with a retrograde orbit